Norman Stewart 'Snowy' Walker (1901 – 1977) was a South African international lawn bowler.

Bowls career
Walker who was born is Dundee in Scotland won three medals at the Commonwealth Games. In 1938 he won a rinks (fours) silver followed by the gold medal in the fours at the 1950 British Empire Games and in 1958 he won another silver medal in the fours at the 1958 British Empire and Commonwealth Games.

He competed in the first World Bowls Championship in Kyeemagh, New South Wales, Australia in 1966  and won a silver medal in the pairs with Tommy Press at the event.

He won the 1954 singles and two rinks titles at the National Championships bowling for the Pretoria West Bowls Club.

References

South African male bowls players
Scottish male bowls players
British emigrants to South Africa
Sportspeople from Dundee
1901 births
1977 deaths
Commonwealth Games gold medallists for South Africa
Commonwealth Games silver medallists for South Africa
Bowls players at the 1938 British Empire Games
Bowls players at the 1950 British Empire Games
Bowls players at the 1958 British Empire and Commonwealth Games
Commonwealth Games medallists in lawn bowls
Medallists at the 1938 British Empire Games
Medallists at the 1950 British Empire Games
Medallists at the 1958 British Empire and Commonwealth Games